The ninth season of the reality competition series American Ninja Warrior premiered on June 12, 2017 on NBC. Hosts Matt Iseman and Akbar Gbaja-Biamila returned for their respective eighth and fifth seasons, alongside sideline reporter Kristine Leahy who returned for her third season. In addition prior to the ninth-season premiere, NBC aired a special ANW Celebrity, Red Nose Day edition featuring nine celebrities, each coached by nine elite ninjas on May 25 before airing USA vs. The World III on June 4.

This year for the first time, the top five women in each city qualifying course qualified for the city finals course, and the top two women in each city finals qualify for national finals, regardless of their placement overall. Beginning in Season 9, wildcard invitations will no longer be allowed for the National Finals in Vegas as only competitors who finish their city finals or those in the Top 15 (men) or Top 2 (women) by the end of the night will advance. Also, the show introduces ANW Obstacle Design Challenge, where from over 2500 fan-submitted obstacles, seven chosen obstacles are introduced in the show.

Competition schedule

Obstacles

City Qualifying & Finals
 Indicates obstacles created by fans for the "American Ninja Warrior Obstacle Design Challenge".

National Finals

City courses

Los Angeles

Qualifying
The Los Angeles Qualifying featured two new obstacles, Cannonball Drop and Battering Ram. The night concluded with 22 finishers. Grant McCartney earned the "POM Wonderful Run of the Night" with the fastest time (1:26.37). Other finishers include Adam Rayl and Kevin Bull.

Finals

The Los Angeles Finals featured two new obstacles, Swinging Peg Board and Elevator Climb. The round concluded with four finishers. The "Papal Ninja" Sean Bryan just edged out concrete worker Adam Rayl (5:07.92) to earn the fastest finish of the night with a time of 5:07.22. Grant McCartney was eliminated after failing the Salmon Ladder, and David Campbell advanced.

San Antonio

Qualifying

The San Antonio Qualifying featured two new or modified obstacles (Spinning Bridge (modified) and Sky Hooks (new)) and concluded with 16 finishers. Both ANW veteran Brent Steffensen and former Olympic gymnast Jonathan Horton returned to full form by completing the course and moving onto the next round. ANW trainer Daniel Gil earned the "POM Wonderful Run of the Night" with the fastest time (1:43.24). Also, IndyCar racer Conor Daly competed, but failed on the first obstacle. The first woman up the Warped Wall, Kacy Catanzaro, failed the Sky Hooks when the ring slipped off the hook while she was attempting to make a transition, but she placed in the women's top 5 and moved on to the finals.

Finals

The San Antonio Finals featured a new obstacle, Spinball Wizard. The round concluded with only one finisher. Daniel Gil completed the course on the final run with a time of 5:50.65, saving San Antonio from having no finishers like last year in Philadelphia, and earned the POM Wonderful Run of the Night, knocking Nate Burkhalter out of the top 15. Also, Kacy Catanzaro did make it past the Sky Hooks, the obstacle she failed on in qualifying, and made it to the Warped Wall, but was unable to make it up the 14.5 foot version. However, she placed in the women's top 2 and moved on to the National Finals.

Daytona Beach

Qualifying
The Daytona Beach Qualifying had two new obstacles, one designed by tennis instructor and walk-on competitor Kevin Carbone. He won the ANW Obstacle Design Contest and made it through his own Wingnuts obstacle. The other new obstacle was the Rolling Pin. Gym owner Drew Drechsel earned the "POM Wonderful Run of the Night" with the fastest time (1:10.49). Stuntwoman Jessie Graff finished 26th overall and 1st among the women competitors. Also, NASCAR driver Ben Kennedy competed, but failed on the second obstacle.

Finals
The Daytona Beach Finals had a new obstacle, the Giant Cubes. Like last week in San Antonio, the round concluded with only one finisher. Drew Drechsel completed the course on the final run with a time of 7:34.60, saving Daytona Beach from having no finishers like last year in Philadelphia, and earned the "POM Wonderful  Run of the Night", knocking Eddy Stewart out of the top 15. Jessie Graff became the first woman to reach the Elevator Climb. Ricky Vu exited on the first obstacle due to leg cramps. JJ Woods was looking strong on the Elevator Climb, but his grip gave out before he could reach the top.

Obstacles used, in addition to those during the qualifiers, for the Daytona Beach Finals are listed below.

Kansas City

Qualifying
The Kansas City Qualifying round had three new obstacles, the Hang Glider, the Broken Pipes, and Crank it Up. Lance Pekus earned the "POM Wonderful Run of the Night" with the fastest time (2:10.16). Other finishers include Brandon Mears, Tyler Yamauchi, Tyler Smith, and Ethan Swanson.

Finals
The Kansas City Finals round had a new obstacle, the Iron Maiden. The round concluded without any finishers, making it the second time in ANW history that a city finals course was unfinished after last year in Philadelphia. Ethan Swanson and the Towers of Power all fell on the third obstacle. Maggi Thorne became the first woman to defeat Crank It Up and earned the "POM Wonderful Run of the Night".

Obstacles used, in addition to those during the Qualifying, for the Kansas City Finals are listed below.

Cleveland

Qualifying
The Cleveland Qualifying featured two new obstacles. Allyssa Beird was the first woman to complete the course this season; she and Jesse Labreck were the first two women to hit the buzzer during the same qualifier. It was also the first time that two couples (Jesse Labreck and Chris DiGangi, and Allyssa Beird and James McGrath) completed the course during the same qualifying run. Jesse Labreck also earned the "POM Wonderful Run of the Night."

Finals
The Cleveland Finals round introduced a new obstacle, the Nail Clipper, which defeated all but two competitors. "Captain NBC" Jamie Rahn was the first to hit the buzzer, earning the "POM Wonderful Run of the Night" with a time of 8:39.85. James McGrath's streak of six Nationals appearances ended when he fell on the dismount from the Nail Clipper, as Joe Moravsky knocked him out of the top 15 and finished the course even faster with a time of 7:24.10. Michelle Warnky made it farther than all but 6 other women in the city finals of ANW 9, making it to the Nail Clipper, but her slow time prevented her from going to Vegas with a talented field of women in Cleveland.

Obstacles used, in addition to those during the qualifiers, for the Cleveland City Finals are listed below.

Denver

Qualifying
The Denver Qualifying featured two new obstacles. The competition concluded with a 2nd to lowest total of only 8 finishers. The fastest run was awarded to gym owner Lorin Ball who earned the "POM Wonderful Run of the Night" with a time of 1:42.89. Also, PBR bull rider Venn Johns competed, but failed on the third obstacle. Jake Murray also competed, but failed on the third obstacle as well.

Finals
Obstacles used, in addition to those during Qualifying, for the Denver Finals are listed below. Ian Dory continued his city finals completion streak, earning the "POM Wonderful Run of the Night" as the only finisher with a time of 6:56.33. Lorin Ball exhibited all of his upper-body training on the Wedge, and was one of the three people to clear the obstacle.

Note: The competitors of Denver Finals were also given free tickets to the premiere of The Lego Ninjago Movie.

City Qualifying Leaderboard

City Finals Leaderboard

National Finals
The National Finals were held along the Las Vegas Strip, as has been the case since the series set up its own finals course instead of sending competitors to Japan.

Stage 1

All competitors must complete the eight obstacles on Stage 1 with a time limit of 2:35.00. Highlights from the first half included school teacher Allyssa Beird who made ANW history by becoming only the second woman (also the third worldwide, the first two being Chie Tanabe in Sasuke 2 and Jessie Graff in the eighth season of ANW) to complete Stage One, earning her the POM Wonderful "Run of the Night". Also, at only 5 feet tall, gymnastics coach Barclay Stockett became the second woman to get past the Warped Wall on Stage One. Later, NBC sports announcer Mike Tirico joined ANW announcers Matt Iseman and Akbar Gbajabiamila for a few play-by-plays of the competitors. During the second half, "Real Life Ninja" Drew Drechsel earned the POM Wonderful "Run of the Night" with the fastest run on Stage One of the competition with a speedy time of 1:33.71. David Campbell's Stage 1 fail streak was over as he finished the course for the first time since Season Two. This season broke the previous record of most Stage 1 finishers with 41, beating the previous record of 38 from Season 7. Also, this was Kacy Catanzaro's final ANW appearance, as she failed on the Double Dipper. She signed with WWE in late August and the company's NXT brand in early 2018.

Stage 1 featured three new obstacles, the Double Dipper, Parkour Run, and the Domino Pipes.

Competitors who completed Stage 1 are listed below. △ denotes female competitors.

Stage 2

As always in the national finals, Stage 2 consists of six obstacles. In order to move on to Stage 3, competitors must finish the Stage 2 course in under 4:00.00.

Stage 2 featured three new obstacles, the Criss Cross Salmon Ladder, the Swing Surfer, and Wingnut Alley.

Results:

A total of 24 ninjas were taken out by Wingnut Alley.  Alyssa Beird, the lone female to advance to Stage 2, was eliminated on the Criss Cross Salmon Ladder.

Leaderboard

Stage 3

Stage 3 featured three new obstacles, the Nail Clipper (from the Cleveland Finals), the Peg Cloud, and the Time Bomb.

Results:

Ratings

U.S. Nielsen ratings

References

American Ninja Warrior
2017 American television seasons